This is a list of the mammal species recorded in the Falkland Islands. There are 28 mammal species in and around the Falkland Islands, of which two are endangered and two are vulnerable. The Falkland Island wolf is the only species on the islands which has gone extinct.

The following tags are used to highlight each species' conservation status as assessed by the International Union for Conservation of Nature:

Some species were assessed using an earlier set of criteria. Species assessed using this system have the following instead of near threatened and least concern categories:

Order: Chiroptera (bats) 

The bats' most distinguishing feature is that their forelimbs are developed as wings, making them the only mammals capable of flight. Bat species account for about 20% of all mammals.

Family: Molossidae
Genus: Tadarida
 Mexican free-tailed bat, T. brasiliensis

Order: Cetacea (whales) 

The order Cetacea includes whales, dolphins and porpoises. They are the mammals most fully adapted to aquatic life with a spindle-shaped nearly hairless body, protected by a thick layer of blubber, and forelimbs and tail modified to provide propulsion underwater.

Suborder: Mysticeti
Family: Balaenidae
Genus: Eubalaena
 Southern right whale, Eubalaena australis LR/cd
Family: Balaenopteridae
Subfamily: Balaenopterinae
Genus: Balaenoptera
Sei whale, B. borealis EN
Southern sei whale, B. b. schlegelii 
Blue whale, B. musculus EN
Southern blue whale, B. m. intermedia 
Fin whale, B. physalus VU
Southern fin whale, B. p. quoyi 
Subfamily: Megapterinae
Genus: Megaptera
 Humpback whale, Megaptera novaeangliae LC
Family: Neobalaenidae
Genus: Caperea
 Pygmy right whale, Caperea marginata LR/lc
Suborder: Odontoceti
Superfamily: Platanistoidea
Family: Phocoenidae
Genus: Phocoena
 Spectacled porpoise, Phocoena dioptrica DD
Family: Physeteridae
Genus: Physeter
 Sperm whale, Physeter macrocephalus VU
Family: Ziphidae
Genus: Ziphius
 Cuvier's beaked whale, Ziphius cavirostris DD
Genus: Berardius
 Arnoux's beaked whale, Berardius arnuxii DD
Subfamily: Hyperoodontinae
Genus: Hyperoodon
 Southern bottlenose whale, Hyperoodon planifrons LC
Genus: Mesoplodon
 Gray's beaked whale, Mesoplodon grayi DD
 Hector's beaked whale, Mesoplodon hectori DD
 Layard's beaked whale, Mesoplodon layardii DD
Family: Delphinidae (marine dolphins)
Genus: Cephalorhynchus
 Commerson's dolphin, Cephalorhynchus commersonii DD
Genus: Lagenorhynchus
 Peale's dolphin, Lagenorhynchus australis DD
 Hourglass dolphin, Lagenorhynchus cruciger LR/lc
 Dusky dolphin, Lagenorhynchus obscurus DD
Genus: Lissodelphis
 Southern right whale dolphin, Lissodelphis peronii DD
Genus: Orcinus
 Orca, Orcinus orca LR/cd
Genus: Globicephala
 Long-finned pilot whale, Globicephala melas DD

Order: Carnivora (carnivorans) 

There are over 260 species of carnivorans, the majority of which feed primarily on meat. They have a characteristic skull shape and dentition.

Suborder: Caniformia
Family: Canidae (dogs, foxes)
Genus: Dusicyon
 Falkland Island wolf, D. australis EX
Family: Otariidae (eared seals, sealions)
Genus: Arctophoca
 South American fur seal, Arctophoca australis LR/lc
Genus: Otaria
 South American sea lion, Otaria flavescens LR/lc
Family: Phocidae (earless seals)
Genus: Hydrurga
 Leopard seal, Hydrurga leptonyx LR/lc
Genus: Leptonychotes
 Weddell seal, Leptonychotes weddellii LR/lc
Genus: Lobodon
 Crabeater seal, Lobodon carcinophagus LR/lc
Genus: Mirounga
 Southern elephant seal, Mirounga leonina LR/lc
Family: Mustelidae
Genus: Lontra (otters) 
Marine otter, Lontra felina, EX (occasional vagrant sightings from Patagonia.)

Order: Artiodactyla (even-toed ungulates) 
The even-toed ungulates are ungulates whose weight is borne about equally by the third and fourth toes, rather than mostly or entirely by the third as in perissodactyls. There are about 220 artiodactyl species, including many that are of great economic importance to humans.

Family: Cervidae (deer)
Subfamily: Capreolinae
Genus: Rangifer
Reindeer, R. tarandus  introduced
Family: Camelidae (camelids)
Genus: Lama
Guanaco, L. guanicoe  introduced

See also
List of chordate orders
Lists of mammals by region
List of prehistoric mammals
Mammal classification
List of mammals described in the 2000s

Notes

References
 

Falkland Islands-related lists
Falkland Islands

Falkland Islands